Flight 389 may refer to:

United Airlines Flight 389, crashed on 16 August 1965
Cubana de Aviación Flight 389, crashed on 29 August 1998

0389